Chorweiler is the sixth borough (Stadtbezirk) of Cologne, Germany. Large portion of the borough of Chorweiler were incorporated into the city of Cologne in 1922, the borough of Chorweiler was created in the 1970s. The borough has the lowest population density in Cologne and many areas are very rural.

The borough of Chorweiler borders with the Cologne boroughs of Nippes and Ehrenfeld to the South, Rhein-Erft-Kreis to the West, Rhein-Kreis Neuss to the North, and the Rhine to the East. On the other riverbank lie the city of Leverkusen and Monheim am Rhein.

Subdivisions 
Chorweiler consists of twelve Stadtteile (city parts):

Transportation 

Chorweiler is served by numerous railway stations and highway. Train station include Köln-Chorweiler, Köln-Chorweiler Nord, Köln-Volkhovener Weg and Köln-Worringen, as well as numerous light rail stations of Cologne Stadtbahn line 12 and 15. The Bundesautobahn 57 connects Chorweiler with the Cologne Beltway.

Rhine bridges 
  Leverkusener Brücke

References

External links 
 Official webpage of the district 

 
Boroughs and quarters of Cologne